Francis Saint-Léger (born February 22, 1957 in Mende, Lozère) was a member of the National Assembly of France.  He represented Lozère's 1st constituency as is a member of the Union for a Popular Movement until the 2012 election, when the two Lozère constituencies were combined into one.

References

1957 births
Living people
People from Mende, Lozère
Union for a Popular Movement politicians
Deputies of the 12th National Assembly of the French Fifth Republic
Deputies of the 13th National Assembly of the French Fifth Republic